The Speaker of the People's Assembly of Syria (Arabic: رئيس مجلس الشعب السوري rayiys majlis alshaeb alsuwrii) represents the People's Assembly, Syria's legislature, signs documents and speaks on its behalf. Throughout its history, the Speaker has been responsible for representing the Assembly. As of 2017, 30 different people have served as speakers.

Election
A People's Assembly is elected every fourth calendar year. The first meeting of a newly elected People's Assembly is responsible for electing its Speaker.

Powers
The People's Assembly should meet at least three times a year, the Speaker has the power to convene an extraordinary meeting of the Assembly. The guards of the People's Assembly are under the authority of the Speaker.

Presidential elections
60 days before the term of the President expires, the Speaker calls for new elections. All presidential candidates have to be approved personally by the Speaker. If only one candidate is acceptable, the Speaker is supposed to postpone the elections. The election result is to be announced when the results have been counted.

List of officeholders

See also
President of Syria
List of presidents of Syria
Vice President of Syria
Prime Minister of Syria
List of prime ministers of Syria
Minister of Foreign Affairs and Expatriates (Syria)

References

Politics of Syria
Syria, People's Assembly
Speakers of the People's Assembly of Syria
Syria politics-related lists